David Wayne Loebsack (born December 23, 1952) is an American politician who served as the U.S. representative for  from 2007 to 2021. A member of the Democratic Party, he also is an emeritus professor of political science at Cornell College, where he had taught since 1982. 
On April 12, 2019, Loebsack announced he would not seek reelection.

U.S. House of Representatives

Committee assignments
Committee on Armed Services
Subcommittee on Military Personnel
Subcommittee on Readiness
Committee on Education and the Workforce
Subcommittee on Higher Education and Workforce Training
Subcommittee on Health, Employment, Labor, and Pensions

Caucus memberships
Congressional Cement Caucus
Congressional Progressive Caucus
Congressional Arts Caucus
Afterschool Caucuses

Voting record
Out of 1,551 total votes, Loebsack voted with the Democratic Party 90% of the time. He has voted consistently to protect legal access to abortion and to pass measures that instill regulations that aim to protect the environment.

Political campaigns

2006

In 2006, Loebsack narrowly defeated 15-term Republican incumbent Jim Leach in one of the biggest upsets of the cycle. Loebsack was nominated by a special convention of the 2nd District after failing to get the required number of signatures to be on the primary ballot. Since there was no one qualified for the ballot, the convention was called to determine the nomination. The 2nd had been trending Democratic for some time (a Republican presidential candidate had not carried it since 1984), and was considered the most Democratic-leaning district in the state. It was taken for granted that Leach would be succeeded by a Democrat once he retired, but he was not considered particularly vulnerable due to his moderate voting record, popularity, and longtime incumbency. Loebsack won largely by running up an 8,395-vote margin in Johnson County, home to Iowa City.

2008

Loebsack was easily reelected in 2008, taking 57 percent of the vote over Mariannette Miller-Meeks, a doctor from Ottumwa and the former president of the state medical society.

2010

Loebsack faced Miller-Meeks again in 2010 and had a much more difficult time of it than he had two years earlier. He prevailed with only 51% of the vote, largely by running up a 13,900-vote margin in Johnson County. Terry Branstad easily carried the district in his successful bid to reclaim the governorship. Chuck Grassley carried every county in the district except Johnson; in fact, Johnson was the only county Grassley lost in his bid for another term.

2012

After redistricting moved Loebsack's longtime home in Mount Vernon to the 1st District of fellow Democrat Bruce Braley, Loebsack moved to Iowa City in the reconfigured 2nd.  The redrawn district is less Democratic than its predecessor; it regained Davenport, which had been the anchor of the 2nd and its predecessors for decades before being shifted out of the district in the 2000s round of redistricting.

Loebsack won the election with 55.4% of the vote. His Republican opponent, John Archer, got 42.5%; Alan Aversa, an Independent candidate, received 2.2%. Braley won the 1st district with 56.9% of the vote.

2014

Loebsack beat Miller-Meeks, 52.5% to 47.5%. The 1st district went Republican, leaving Loebsack the only Democratic House member from Iowa.

2016

In October 2016, the Daily Iowan endorsed Loebsack, saying that while he was "not perfect" he displayed a "willingness to work with the other side" and had "maintained some degree of competence in office." Loebsack defeated surgeon Christopher Peters, 54% to 46%. Again, Loebsack was the only Democrat that Iowa sent to the House in 2016. The state was won by Donald Trump by a comfortable margin, and Republican Chuck Grassley was re-elected to the U.S. Senate by a landslide. Despite the Republican swing in Iowa, Loebsack managed to hold his position as a Democrat.

2018

In a rematch of the 2016 election, Loebsack defeated Peters by a comfortable margin with 54.8% of the vote. Democrats also flipped the 1st and 3rd districts in this election cycle; therefore, Loebsack was no longer the sole Democratic member of Iowa's congressional delegation.

Tenure

Taxation
In November 2017, Loebsack was the only House member from Iowa to vote against the GOP tax reform bill, claiming the "tax plan that was rushed through the House of Representatives will hurt everyday Iowans."

Immigration
In September 2017, Loebsack told Ottumwa voters that he supports Dreamers. He said, "We've got to do everything we can to protect them."

2020 presidential election

Ahead of the 2020 Iowa Democratic caucuses, Loebsack endorsed former South Bend, Indiana, mayor Pete Buttigieg for President of the United States. After Buttigieg withdrew from the primaries, he endorsed eventual Democratic nominee Joe Biden on March 12, 2020.

Electoral history

2006

2008

2010

2012

2014

2016

2018

References

External links

1952 births
21st-century American politicians
American expatriates in Iceland
American Methodists
Methodists from Iowa
Cornell College faculty
Democratic Party members of the United States House of Representatives from Iowa
Iowa State University alumni
Living people
Politicians from Sioux City, Iowa
University of California, Davis alumni